Sambucus australis is a species of tree in the family Adoxaceae. It is native to South America.

Distribution
Sambucus australis ranges from southeastern and southern Brazil to Paraguay, Uruguay, and northeastern Argentina.

References

australis
Trees of Argentina
Trees of Uruguay
Trees of Brazil
Trees of Paraguay